In information theory, Fano's inequality (also known as the Fano converse and the Fano lemma) relates the average information lost in a noisy channel to the probability of the categorization error.  It was derived by Robert Fano in the early 1950s while teaching a Ph.D. seminar in information theory at MIT, and later recorded in his 1961 textbook.

It is used to find a lower bound on the error probability of any decoder as well as the lower bounds for minimax risks in density estimation.

Let the random variables  and  represent input and output messages with a joint probability . Fano's inequality is

is the conditional entropy,

is the probability of the communication error, and

is the corresponding binary entropy.

Proof

Define an indicator random variable , that indicates the event that our estimate  is in error,

Consider . We can use the chain rule for entropies to expand this in two different ways

Equating the two

Expanding the right most term, 

This makes the term .
Hence

The other term, because conditioning reduces entropy. Because of the way  is defined, meaning that . Putting it all together,

Because  is a Markov chain, we have  by the data processing inequality, and hence , giving us

Alternative formulation
Let  be a random variable with density equal to one of  possible densities . Furthermore, the Kullback–Leibler divergence between any pair of densities cannot be too large,
 for all 

Let  be an estimate of the index. Then

where  is the probability induced by

Generalization
The following generalization is due to Ibragimov and Khasminskii (1979), Assouad and Birge (1983).

Let F be a class of densities with a subclass of r + 1 densities ƒθ such that for any θ ≠ θ′

Then in the worst case the expected value of error of estimation is bound from below,

where ƒn is any density estimator based on a sample of size n.

References
 P. Assouad, "Deux remarques sur l'estimation", Comptes Rendus de l'Académie des Sciences de Paris, Vol. 296, pp. 1021–1024, 1983.
 L. Birge, "Estimating a density under order restrictions: nonasymptotic minimax risk", Technical report, UER de Sciences Économiques, Universite Paris X, Nanterre, France, 1983.
 
 L. Devroye, A Course in Density Estimation. Progress in probability and statistics, Vol 14. Boston, Birkhauser, 1987. , .
 
 also: Cambridge, Massachusetts, M.I.T. Press, 1961. 
 R. Fano, Fano inequality Scholarpedia, 2008.
 I. A. Ibragimov, R. Z. Has′minskii, Statistical estimation, asymptotic theory. Applications of Mathematics, vol. 16, Springer-Verlag, New York, 1981. 

Information theory
Inequalities